Yahoo! Finance is a media property that is part of the Yahoo! network. It provides financial news, data and commentary including stock quotes, press releases, financial reports, and original content.  It also offers some online tools for personal finance management. In addition to posting partner content from other web sites, it posts original stories by its team of staff journalists. It is ranked 20th by SimilarWeb on the list of largest news and media websites.

In 2017 Yahoo! Finance added the feature to look at news surrounding cryptocurrency. It lists over 9,000 unique coins including Bitcoin and Ethereum.

See also
 Google Finance
 MSN Money

References

 https://finance.yahoo.com/portfolios

External links
 Yahoo! Finance

Economics websites
Finance
Internet properties established in 1997
IOS software
Android (operating system) software